The Kurt-Koffka Medal, Kurt Koffka Medal, Kurt Koffka Award, or Koffka Prize is an annual, international award bestowed by Giessen University's Department of Psychology for "advancing the fields of perception or developmental psychology to an extraordinary extent". The prize commemorates the German psychologist Kurt Koffka, a pioneer of Gestalt Psychology, in particular in the fields of perception and developmental psychology. Koffka worked at Giessen University for 16 years, from 1911 to 1927. The medal was first awarded in 2007.

The medal is notable among psychologists.

History

Kurt Koffka (18 March 1886 – 22 November 1941) was a German psychologist. He was born and educated in Berlin. Along with Max Wertheimer and his close associate Wolfgang Köhler they established Gestalt psychology. Koffka's interests were wide-ranging, and they included: perception, hearing impairments in brain-damaged patients, interpretation, learning, and the extension of Gestalt theory to developmental psychology.

Each year since 2006, a committee of Giessen University Department of Psychology has sought nominations and decided on the recipient(s) of the award. The first medal was awarded in 2007 to Martin "Marty" Banks. The one exception was 2020, when the award ceremony was deferred to 2021 because of the COVID-19 pandemic.

Description of the medal
The medal is bronze. The front (obverse) side is shown in the info box. A recipient's name is engraved on the outer ring at the bottom. The other side is an embossed version of the seal of the university.

Nominations
Nomination forms are sent by the members of the Committee to large numbers of individuals, usually in September the year before the award is made. These individuals are generally prominent academics working in a relevant area.

Selection
The members of the Committee prepare a report reflecting the advice of experts in the relevant fields.

Prizewinners
Source: Justus Liebig University, Giessen
2007: Martin Banks
2008: Claes van Hofsten 
2009: Janette Atkinson and Oliver Braddick
2010: Roberta Klatzky
2011: Concetta Morrone and David Burr
2012: Sandra Trehub
2013: Stuart Anstis
2014: Elizabeth Spelke
2015: Roland S. Johansson
2016: Andrew N. Meltzoff
2017: Jan J. Koenderink and Andrea J. van Doorn
2018: Karen E. Adolph
2019: Dan Kersten
2020: No award
2021: Linda B. Smith
2022: Ted Adelson

Gender balance of recipients 
Unlike some science awards, such as the Nobel prize, the Kurt-Koffka medal has a good gender balance of recipients (by 2022, 10 men and 8 women).

See also

 Nobel prize
 Fields Medal
 Ig Nobel Prize
 List of prizes known as the Nobel of a field
 Lists of science and technology awards
 List of psychology awards

References 

Academic awards
International awards
Science and technology awards
German science and technology awards
University of Giessen
Perception
Psychology awards